Daniel James Hanford (born 6 March 1991) is a Welsh professional footballer who has played as a goalkeeper for Carlisle United Floriana Hereford United, Gateshead.Southport Clitheroe

Club career

Early career
Born in Swansea, Hanford played in the youth system of Swansea City between the ages of 7 and 16. After spells at Rochdale and Clitheroe, he joined the Glenn Hoddle Academy in Spain. He returned to England in 2011 to play for Hereford United, although his two-year spell there was marred by the club's financial troubles and his own lack of first team opportunities. At the end of the 2012–13 season, he moved to Malta to play for Floriana. After a successful season as a first team regular and winning a cup, he moved to Carlisle United ahead of the 2014–15 season.

Carlisle United

Hanford joined Carlisle after their relegation to League Two in the 2013–14 season. He was signed on a one-year contract as the understudy to the club's regular goalkeeper Mark Gillespie. He made his debut for Carlisle in September 2014, in a 1–0 win against Tranmere, after Gillespie suffered a groin injury. He made many appearances that season.

In 2015–16, Hanford found his chances limited to a couple of cup appearances only due to Gillespie's good form.
In May 2016, he was released.

Gateshead
After a successful trial in the summer of 2016, Hanford signed a one-year deal with National League side Gateshead.

Southport
In May 2018 he joined Southport on a free transfer, signing a two-year contract.

Back to Carlisle
In June 2021, Carlisle based Hanford returned to Carlisle United as a player and goalkeeping coach to help the first team with his experience.

International career

Hanford has represented Wales at the Under-17 and Under-19 levels.

Career statistics

References

External links

1991 births
Living people
Welsh footballers
Association football goalkeepers
Hereford United F.C. players
Floriana F.C. players
Carlisle United F.C. players
Gateshead F.C. players
National League (English football) players
Maltese Premier League players
English Football League players
Welsh expatriate footballers
Southport F.C. players
Wales youth international footballers